Dieter Kalt, Jr. (born 26 June 1974) is an Austrian former professional ice hockey player. Kalt was the director of player development with EC KAC before leaving in 2018. He most notably played for Klagenfurt AC in the Erste Bank Hockey League, his hometown club, following the footsteps of club legend and father Dieter Kalt Sr.

Playing career 
Before joining Red Bull Salzburg EC has he played for Vienna Capitals (EBHL), Färjestads BK (Swedish Elite League), Kölner Haie (DEL), Long Beach Ice Dogs (IHL), Klagenfurt AC (EBHL), Adler Mannheim (DEL) and Luleå HF of the Elitserien.

He has represented Austria in fourteen World Championships, including 2007 and three Olympic Games, 1994, 1998 and 2002.

In 2013, Kalt was named the head coach of the Austria men's national junior ice hockey team. He was the director of player development with EC KAC before leaving in 2018.

Personal life
Kalt's father, Dieter Kalt Sr., served as president for the Austrian Ice Hockey Federation and was inducted into the IIHF Hall of Fame as a builder in 2017.

Career statistics

Regular season and playoffs

International

References

External links

1974 births
Living people
Adler Mannheim players
Austrian ice hockey right wingers
EC Red Bull Salzburg players
Färjestad BK players
Ice hockey players at the 1994 Winter Olympics
Ice hockey players at the 1998 Winter Olympics
Ice hockey players at the 2002 Winter Olympics
EC KAC players
Kölner Haie players
Long Beach Ice Dogs (IHL) players
Luleå HF players
Olympic ice hockey players of Austria
Sportspeople from Klagenfurt
Vienna Capitals players